Quetschentaart, a popular Luxembourg speciality, is a simple open fruit tart with zwetschgen.

In the Ketty Thull recipe, the dough for the shortcrust base consists of flour, butter and sugar (unusual for French-style shortcrust, but to balance the sourness, which is key) only. The base is placed in a tart-baking dish, and covered with halved plums (no stones) arranged in overlapping circles. It is baked at - for 45-40 minutes or until ready.

In other recipes, the base is made with a yeast dough.

Traditionally, it is a seasonal dish served in the autumn when the zwetschgen are ripe.
It is often served with whipped cream at afternoon coffee.

References

Luxembourgian cuisine
Tarts
Luxembourgian desserts
Plum dishes